Peter Wilmshurst is a British medical doctor and successful whistleblower who has been the subject of multiple cases of harassment through vexatious libel actions brought by companies whose products he criticised as ineffective. He has also reported at least twenty doctors to the General Medical Council in the course of two decades of investigating research misconduct.

Background

Sterling-Winthrop case 
In 1986, Wilmshurst, a cardiologist then working at St. Thomas' Hospital, London, approached The Guardian newspaper with a substantial dossier detailing alleged misconduct in the development of Amrinone, a cardiac drug manufactured by Sterling-Winthrop. The drug was supported by a study at Harvard Medical School and published in the New England Journal of Medicine, whose lead author was Eugene Braunwald, a leader in his field. Wilmshurst's group ran a series of experiments on the promising new drug but found no effect on contractility and frequent life-threatening side effects. Wilmshurst reported these findings to Sterling-Winthrop, who asked him to suppress the data. He refused, and they retaliated by threatening litigation. He continued the research and published his adverse findings in abstracts and conference presentations, until Sterling-Winthrop staff removed all stocks of the drug from the hospital pharmacy. A review by the Netherlands Committee for the Evaluation of Medicine found substantial discrepancies between the record cards of Wilmshurst's group and those submitted by Sterling-Winthrop. Wilmshurst showed that they had falsified the records, suppressing the adverse events he had reported. He then contacted the UK's Committee for the Safety of Medicines and discovered that Sterling-Winthrop had also failed to report the adverse events to the UK; they had also threatened the UK Government with closure of a large manufacturing plant in the UK. Sterling-Winthrop subsequently reported over 1,400 adverse events to the US Federal Food and Drug Administration, and terminated research and marketing in the US, while continuing to market the drug in the developing world. Finally, after a substantial Guardian feature, they withdrew the oral drug entirely in 1986. In 2003 he was given the Health Watch Award for this work.

NMT Medical case 
In 2000, Wilmshurst published a paper linking migraine to patent foramen ovale, a common cardiac condition affecting up to one in four people. This led NMT Medical to develop a PFO closure device branded STARflex. Wilmshurst was recruited as part of the "Migraine Intervention with STARflex Technology" (MIST) trial. The number of patients and potential value of the market (estimated in excess of $15bn) drove NMT's stock price to $25/share. A substantial discrepancy emerged between echocardiogram result interpretations of the implanting cardiologists and Wilmshurst's review. Wilmshurst reported a significantly higher proportion (one in three versus four in sixty-five) with residual cardiac shunts. An independent review backed Wilmshurst's figures. Less than a fortnight after returning from a conference in Washington where he discussed his results, Wilmshurst was contacted by lawyers for NMT making accusations of "seriously defamatory allegations". The first NMT libel suit was lodged in 2007, and drew media attention. NMT served four separate writs on Wilmshurst. The courts demanded that they lodge £200,000 due to their parlous financial state and the likelihood of failing in the action. NMT declared bankruptcy after pursuing Wilmshurst for over three years.

Bawa-Garba Case 
In light of the Hadiza Bawa-Garba case, Dr Peter Wilmhurst has both referred himself to the GMC, as well as asking the regulatory body to both remove himself from the register, and scrutinise his medical practice. This is due to the ongoing concern felt by medical practitioners in England with the GMC's outcome and appeal (successfully won) against Bawa-Garba. Multiple parties have been concerned about the outcome of this hearing, as well as the repercussions on current medical practice.

Libel reform 
Wilmshurst's experience, along with British Chiropractic Association v Singh, have been cited as catalysts for the UK's libel reform campaign, leading to the Defamation Act 2013.

References 

Living people
Year of birth missing (living people)
20th-century British medical doctors
21st-century British medical doctors
British cardiologists
British medical researchers
British whistleblowers